Oberon Media was a multi-platform casual games company, delivering casual games across online, social, mobile/Smartphone, interactive TV and retail categories. Oberon games were adopted by global digital and media companies, such as Acer, Microsoft, AT&T, Yahoo!, Electronic Arts, and Orange France. 

Oberon Media's game publishing division, I-play, worked with game developers to produce casual games across online, social, mobile/Smartphone, console and iTV platforms. 

Founded in 2003, Oberon Media was headquartered in New York with offices in North America, Europe and Asia, and was backed by Goldman Sachs, Morgan Stanley and Oak Investment Partners.  Co-founder Jane Jensen is the designer of the popular and critically acclaimed Gabriel Knight adventure games.

Oberon Games developed a number of games for Windows XP, Windows Vista, and Windows 7 such as Chess Titans, and Inspector Parker, some of which were later included in Windows 7 as well.

In 2013, the assets of Oberon Media were acquired by iWin, Inc.

References 

Video game publishers